Phil Homeratha (March 22, 1943 – December 29, 2011) was an American sports coach, educator, and college athletics administrator. He coached football, basketball, cross country, track and field, and wrestling at Haskell Indian Nations University in Lawrence, Kansas. Homeratha was the head football coach for the 2010 season at Haskell, leading the Fighting Indians to a record of 1–9. He was also the head women's basketball coach at Haskell from 1995 to 2011 and the school's athletic director for five years before his retirement from coaching in February 2011.

Homeratha was born on March 22, 1943, in Red Rock, Oklahoma to Curtis and Luella (née Black) Homeratha. He was a member of the Otoe–Missouria Tribe of Indians. He graduated from Haskell Institute in 1961 and later earned a Bachelor of Education from Tarkio College in Tarkio, Missouri and a Master of Education from Northwest Missouri State University in Maryville, Missouri.

Homeratha was diagnosed with Stage IV colon cancer in February 2011. He died on December 29, 2011, in Lawrence.

Head coaching record

Football

References

1934 births
2011 deaths
American football halfbacks
Haskell Indian Nations Fighting Indians athletic directors
Haskell Indian Nations Fighting Indians football coaches
Haskell Indian Nations Fighting Indians men's basketball coaches
Tarkio Owls football players
Tarkio Owls men's basketball players
Haskell Indian Nations University alumni
College track and field coaches in the United States
College women's basketball coaches in the United States
College wrestling coaches in the United States
Northwest Missouri State University alumni
People from Noble County, Oklahoma
Native American players of American football
Native American basketball players
Otoe people
Deaths from cancer in Kansas
Deaths from colorectal cancer